Accidentally in Love may refer to:

Accidentally in Love (album), a 2012 album by Freya Lim
Accidentally in Love (TV series), a 2018 Mandarin-language Chinese television drama television series
"Accidentally in Love" (song), a 2004 song by Counting Crows from the soundtrack of Shrek 2